is a 1931 black and white Japanese silent film with benshi accompaniment directed by Tomikazu Miyata. It is based on the original story of a wandering gambler written by the popular author Shin Hasegawa. This is the first film adaptation of his story, which later inspired many filmmakers to create further adaptations of his work. The film was remade in 1957.

The first half of the movie depicts a man's jealousy of his best friend and the woman he loves. The second part depicts a hero who is ready to put the past behind him and risk his life for his friend.

References

External links
 

1931 films
Japanese silent films
Japanese black-and-white films
Japanese drama films
1931 drama films
Silent drama films